Ernie Winchester (18 May 1944 – 8 May 2013) was a Scottish professional football striker who played for Aberdeen, Chicago Spurs, Kansas City Spurs, Heart of Midlothian and Arbroath.

Football career

He signed for his local professional club, Aberdeen FC, in 1959. He finished as the club's top scorer in 1964 and 1966. After 169 appearances and 91 goals in all competitions, he moved to the United States to play in the NASL in 1967. In his first season, he played for Chicago Spurs and scored 13 goals in 13 games. The franchise moved to become the Kansas City Spurs, where he played in 1968 and scored 10 goals in 27 games.

In 1968, he moved back to Scotland to play for Heart of Midlothian and Arbroath. He retired in 1973.

Personal life

Winchester was born in Aberdeen in 1944. He died on 8 May 2013, aged 68, 10 days shy of his 69th birthday.

Career statistics

Club

Appearances and goals by club, season and competition

References

1944 births
2013 deaths
Footballers from Aberdeen
Association football forwards
Scottish footballers
Aberdeen F.C. players
Chicago Spurs players
Kansas City Spurs players
Heart of Midlothian F.C. players
Arbroath F.C. players
Scottish Football League players
National Professional Soccer League (1967) players
North American Soccer League (1968–1984) players
Expatriate soccer players in the United States
Scottish expatriate sportspeople in the United States
Scottish expatriate footballers